Borso del Grappa is a municipality of the Province of Treviso in the Veneto region of northeastern Italy.

References

Cities and towns in Veneto